WYDE-FM (92.5 FM) is a radio station broadcasting an inspirational music format. Licensed to Cordova, Alabama, United States, the station serves the Birmingham, area. To compensate for its weak signal over much of the eastern and southern parts of the Birmingham metropolitan area, the station is simulcast on 850 AM. The station is licensed to Kimtron, Inc. and owned by Crawford Broadcasting.

The station was assigned the WXJC-FM call letters by the Federal Communications Commission on July 9, 2007.

The station, broadcasting at 92.5 FM, is owned by Crawford Broadcasting. Other stations in the Birmingham market that Crawford owns include WDJC-FM (93.7), WXJC-FM (101.1), WXJC (850), and WYDE (1260). The transmitter for WYDE-FM is located in southeastern Walker County near the border with Jefferson County, about 35 miles northwest of downtown Birmingham, and its studios are located in Homewood.

Station history
The station signed on in 1997 as a Top 40 station with the call letters WZJT and the on-air name “Party Radio Z-92.5.” The station was originally owned by the owner and operator of a nightclub in Birmingham. At the time, there was not another Top 40 music station in the Birmingham market, but the location of the station’s transmitter and its weak signal proved to be a hindrance as it sought to establish itself in the area. Within a few months of its debut, the station changed formats and became an active rock station with the new on-air name of “Planet Rock 92-5”. The new format was no more successful in attracting listeners than its previous incarnation.

In 2000, the station was sold and became an affiliate of EWTN’s Catholic radio network. The station’s call letters were changed to WQOP-FM (Queen of Peace, referring to the Virgin Mary). In 2004, Crawford Broadcasting Company bought the station in order to establish an FM simulcast partner of what was then WDJC (850). After the acquisition, the call letters of the AM and FM stations were changed to WXJC and WXJC-FM. The stations offered a combination of Southern gospel music and syndicated Christian teaching programming; as of 2007, the Christian teaching programming continues on WXJC.

In May 2006, WXJC-FM changed its call letters to WPHC, changed its format and attempted to launch a country music format. With other country stations such as Birmingham’s WDXB and WZZK and Tuscaloosa’s WTXT and WFFN serving its primary broadcast area, WPHC failed to attract significant listenership. In October of the same year, WPHC adopted its current format. WPHC changed their call letters back to WXJC-FM.

On November 5, 2018, WXJC-FM changed their call letters to WYDE-FM and changed their format from southern gospel/talk (which moved to WXJC-FM 101.1 FM Cullman) to inspirational music.

See also
List of radio stations in Alabama

References

External links

YDE-FM
YDE-FM
Radio stations established in 1997
1997 establishments in Alabama